Quarantine is a 1983 Soviet children's comedy film directed by Ilya Frez.

Plot
When quarantine is announced in the kindergarten, it turns out that there is no one with whom to leave five year old Masha — everyone is busy with urgent matters. Even the grandparents are swarmed with work. Therefore, Masha has to live with relatives, friends, colleagues and casual acquaintances which leads to many adventures.

Cast
Ailika Kremer as Masha
Yevgeniya Simonova as mother
Yuri Duvanov as father
Svetlana Nemolyaeva as grandmother
Yuri Bogatyryov as grandfather
Tatyana Pelttser as great-grandmother
Pavel Kadochnikov as great-grandfather
 Aleksandr Pashutin as colleague of the grandmother
Lidiya Fedoseyeva-Shukshina as circus cashier
Yelena Solovey as Fyokla
Nina Arkhipova as Aunt Polina
Lyubov Sokolova as Aunt Katya
Vladimir Antonik as Aspidov
Yevgeny Karelskikh as friend of Aspidov
Maria Skvortsova as nurse
Zinaida Naryshkina as "Shapoklyak"
Sergei Plotnikov as "Leo Tolstoy" from the Dream of Masha
Ivan Ryzhov as Petrovich
Dmitry Polonsky as janitor
Marina Yakovleva as the boy's mother
Anton Gribkov as the boy

Awards

Award for the best performance of the female role (Ailika Kremer) of the "International Film Festival of Humor and Satire" in Gabrovo-83;
The "Golden Plateau" award of the International Film Festival of Children's Cinema, held in the framework of the festival of neo-realistic cinema in Avellino-84.

References

External links

Soviet comedy films
1980s children's comedy films
Russian children's comedy films
Gorky Film Studio films
Films directed by Ilya Frez
1983 comedy films
1983 films
Soviet children's films